William Woodson Hudson Jr. (January 24, 1919 – April 5, 1974) was an American actor. He played Ranger Clark in Rocky Jones, Space Ranger and Special Agent Mike Andrews in the Emmy Award nominated spy drama I Led Three Lives.

History
After appearing uncredited in over a dozen movies, Hudson got his break in 1951's Hard, Fast and Beautiful. He appeared in a few other movies and TV shows before being cast as Special Agent Mike Andrews in I Led Three Lives. In 1954, while also still doing I Led Three Lives, Hudson was cast in the television serial Rocky Jones, Space Ranger as Ranger Clark. 

After his stint as Clark on Rocky Jones, Hudson starred in several science fiction, fantasy, and monster movies, in such films as The She Creature, The Amazing Colossal Man. He played the husband in 1958's cult classic Attack of the 50 Foot Woman. In 1964 he was cast as the doomed first Captain of the Seaview, John Phillips, in the pilot episode of Voyage to the Bottom of the Sea. In 1965 he was back on Voyage as a different character in an episode infamous among fans of the series due to its heavy use of archive footage from the pilot episode (specifically a scene with Hudson and Richard Basehart leaving the Nelson Institute, being chased and attacked by a helicopter and which ended with the death of Hudson's character and the car going off a cliff aflame) giving him the dubious honour of being the only person "killed" on that show twice. In 1966 he was cast as a reporter in the second part of the first Television appearance of Mr. Freeze in a first-season episode of Batman titled "Rats Like Cheese". From then on he had several small parts in various movies and TV shows, his last part being Mr. Dunn in 1971's How's Your Love Life?.

He died at age 55 on April 5, 1974 in Woodland Hills, Los Angeles, California from cirrhosis. He was survived by his twin brother, actor John Hudson.

Filmography

References

External links

1919 births
1974 deaths
Male actors from California
American male film actors
American male television actors
Deaths from cirrhosis
People from Gilroy, California
20th-century American male actors